Greenville High School is a public high school in Greenville, Georgia, United States.

Notable alumni
 Mario Alford - professional football player
 Kentavious Caldwell-Pope - professional basketball player

References

External links
 Official website

Public high schools in Georgia (U.S. state)
Schools in Meriwether County, Georgia